Bruce Thomas (born 14 August 1948 in Stockton-on-Tees, England) is an English rock bass guitarist, best known as bassist for the Attractions; the band formed in 1977 to back Elvis Costello in concert and on record.

In addition to his work with the Attractions, Thomas has recorded with Billy Bragg, John Wesley Harding, Suzanne Vega, and Tasmin Archer.

Thomas has also been a nonfiction writer for several decades, and is the author of Bruce Lee: Fighting Spirit (1994), a biography of the renowned martial artist and movie star, and The Body of Time (and the Energies of Being),  (1991), a short book about metaphysics. Rough Notes, published in 2015, is both a memoir of his time with The Attractions and a documentary history of the British music scene of the 1970s.

Early life 

Thomas attended Grangefield Grammar School in Stockton on Tees, and after leaving, worked as a trainee commercial-artist at the local Evening Gazette newspaper. Thomas was originally a harmonica player in local bands. He was in a band called The Tremors and switched to bass guitar when their bass player failed to appear one night.  Thomas eventually joined the Roadrunners (with Paul Rodgers and Micky Moody).  After Rodgers switched from playing bass to being their up-front singer, the band changed their name to The Wildflowers, and in late 1966 decided to quit their respective day-jobs and move to London.  After achieving little success, the band eventually split.

Bands 
Thomas remained in London, playing with the bands Bitter Sweet and Bodast in the late 1960s and recording with Quiver, the Sutherland Brothers, Moonrider and Al Stewart in the early 1970s.

His inventive and highly melodic bass work with Costello brought Thomas his greatest fame. Between 1977 and 1987, Elvis Costello & The Attractions released nine record albums, including This Year's Model (1978), Armed Forces (1979), Imperial Bedroom (1982), Punch the Clock (1983), and Blood & Chocolate (1986), and toured extensively.

During his tenure with the Attractions, Thomas used a wide variety of bass guitars. He at various times owned a selection of Fender Precisions, a Danelectro Longhorn and a Wal bass.

After Costello's initial split with the Attractions in 1987, Thomas recorded with such other artists as Billy Bragg, John Wesley Harding, and Suzanne Vega. In 1990, he released his first book The Big Wheel, a memoir in which the key characters are recognisable without ever being identified by name. Costello, for instance, is called "the singer." Apparently annoyed by his depiction in the book, Costello responded with the song "How To Be Dumb" on his album Mighty Like a Rose (1991). Costello has described his relationship with Thomas during this period as "pretty non-existent".

Despite this estrangement, Costello was persuaded by co-producer Mitchell Froom to invite Thomas to play on the album Brutal Youth (1994).  Thomas was featured on five tracks of the album.  The reunited Elvis Costello & the Attractions followed the album with a tour and another album All This Useless Beauty (1996). Toward the end of a second tour, Costello announced that he would be splitting with the group as soon as the tour was over. Elvis Costello & the Attractions played their final concert on 15 September 1996, in Nagoya, Japan.

Costello has said in interviews with a variety of publications, including the Rocky Mountain News, that the old animosity between himself and Thomas returned. Costello said that Thomas deliberately sabotaged some songs onstage, which was the breaking point. The other two Attractions, Steve Nieve and Pete Thomas (no relation to Bruce), have continued to tour and record with Costello as The Imposters, with Davey Faragher, formerly of Cracker, on bass. Bruce Thomas has said that he simply lost interest in playing with Costello.  In an interview Thomas stated "no reformation is ever going to come about under my initiative – or under any other circumstances I can foresee."

Honours 
In 2003, Thomas was inducted into the Rock and Roll Hall of Fame as a member of Elvis Costello and the Attractions. Thomas appeared onstage with Costello to accept the honour, but they did not perform together. Thomas's book On the Road... Again, the sequel to The Big Wheel, was published that same year.

References

1948 births
Living people
English new wave musicians
English rock bass guitarists
Male bass guitarists
Elvis Costello & the Attractions members
People from Stockton-on-Tees